Abadeh County is in Fars province, Iran. The capital of the county is the city of Abadeh. At the 2006 census, the county's population was 87,203 in 23,387 households. The following census in 2011 counted 98,188 people in 28,501 households, by which time Khosrow Shirin Rural District had been separated from Eqlid County to join Abadeh County. At the 2016 census, the county's population was 100,831 in 31,672 households. It is the most populous county in northern Fars Province.

Administrative divisions

The population history and structural changes of Abadeh County's administrative divisions over three consecutive censuses are shown in the following table. The latest census shows one district, five rural districts, and five cities.

References

 

Counties of Fars Province